The Senior men's race at the 1985 IAAF World Cross Country Championships was held in Lisbon, Portugal, at the Sports Complex of Jamor on March 24, 1985.   A report on the event was given in the Glasgow Herald.

Complete results, medallists, 
 and the results of British athletes were published.

Race results

Senior men's race (12.19 km)

Individual

min, but disqualified.

Teams

Note: Athletes in parentheses did not score for the team result

Participation
An unofficial count yields the participation of 297 athletes from 47 countries in the Senior men's race, two athletes less than the official number published.

 (9)
 (6)
 (9)
 (6)
 (9)
 (9)
 (2)
 (7)
 (5)
 (7)
 (2)
 (9)
 (9)
 (8)
 (9)
 (9)
 (7)
 (9)
 (1)
 (1)
 (9)
 (1)
 (8)
 (7)
 (1)
 (10)
 (3)
 (8)
 (7)
 (8)
 (7)
 (2)
 (1)
 (3)
 (9)
 (1)
 (9)
 (9)
 (2)
 (9)
 (9)
 (7)
 (7)
 (9)
 (8)
 (8)
 (3)

See also
 1985 IAAF World Cross Country Championships – Junior men's race
 1985 IAAF World Cross Country Championships – Senior women's race

References

IAAF World Cross Country Championships
Senior men's race at the World Athletics Cross Country Championships